is a computer operating system command which is used to bring the command line on top of the computer terminal. It is available in various Unix shells on Unix and Unix-like operating systems as well as on other systems such as KolibriOS.

Depending on the system, clear uses the terminfo or termcap database, as well as looking into the environment for the terminal type in order to deduce how to clear the screen. The Unix command clear takes no arguments and is roughly analogous to the command cls on a number of other operating systems.

In ISO 9995-7 specifies that the following symbol be used to indicate this function on a keyboard, which is included in Unicode as: ⎚ CLEAR SCREEN SYMBOL.

One may use the reset command to erase every previous command.

History
The clear command appeared in 2.79BSD on February 24, 1979. Later, in 1985, the command was also included in Unix 8th edition.

See also
 List of Unix commands

References

Further reading

External links
The manual (man) page for clear

Unix software